Kawus ibn Kharakhuruh was the ruler (Sogdian: afshin) of the Principality of Ushrusana during the 9th-century. He was the son and successor of Kharakhuruh.

Biography 
Kawus is first mentioned in ca. 802, when the Abbasid prince al-Ma'mun made several campaigns against Osrushana in order to ensure that Kawus stayed loyal to him. However, when al-Ma'mun ascended the Abbasid throne in 813, Kawus declared independence from the Abbasid Caliphate. In ca. 818, a civil war ensued in Osrushana between several princes. Kawus managed to emerge victorious, while his son Khaydar fled to the Abbasid court in Baghdad.

In 822, an Abbasid army under Ahmad ibn Abi Khalid al-Ahwal conquered Osrushana and captured Kawus ibn Kharakhuruh; he was sent to Baghdad, where he submitted to the Caliph and converted to Islam. From this point on, Osrushana was generally considered to be part of the Abbasid state, although the afshīns were allowed to retain their control over the country as subjects of the caliph. Kawus died sometime later, and was succeeded by his son Khaydar.

References

Sources 
Bosworth, C. Edmund. "Afsin." Encyclopaedia Iranica, Volume I. Ed. Ehsan Yarshater. London: Routledge & Kegan Paul, 1985. 

Al-Baladhuri, Ahmad ibn Jabir. The Origins of the Islamic State, Part II. Trans. Francis Clark Murgotten. New York: Columbia University, 1924.

9th-century deaths
9th-century rulers in Asia
Year of birth unknown
Converts to Islam from Zoroastrianism
9th-century Iranian people
8th-century births
Zoroastrian rulers
Sogdian rulers